Cottle station is a light rail station operated by Santa Clara Valley Transportation Authority (VTA). The station is served by the Blue Line of the VTA Light Rail system. It was part of the original Guadalupe Line, the first segment of light rail from Santa Teresa to Tasman.

Location 
Cottle station is located in the median of State Route 85, near Cottle Road in the southern part of San Jose, California. It is located very close (one mile) to Caltrain's Blossom Hill station, and is even closer to the local hospital and to the Hitachi Global Storage Technologies campus in South San Jose. Since the Caltrain only serves this area in rush hours on weekdays, the light rail service may be used in other hours, although it is slower.

Notes 
The station is also served by shuttles to the local Kaiser hospital and to the Hitachi campus.
The station is about one mile (1.6 km) from Caltrain's Blossom Hill stop; since Caltrain only serves this station in peak direction during rush hours, the slower light rail service can be used at other times.

References

External links 

Cottle Light Rail Station page at VTA

Santa Clara Valley Transportation Authority light rail stations
Santa Clara Valley Transportation Authority bus stations
Railway stations in San Jose, California
Railway stations in the United States opened in 1987
1987 establishments in California